John Condon (28 February 1889 – 21 February 1919) was a British bantamweight professional boxer who competed in the early twentieth century. He fought as Johnny Condon and died a week prior to his 30th birthday of influenza.

Condon won a silver medal in Boxing at the 1908 Summer Olympics

He won the 1909 Amateur Boxing Association British bantamweight title, when boxing out of the Lynn ABC.

References

External links

1889 births
1919 deaths
Bantamweight boxers
Olympic boxers of Great Britain
Boxers at the 1908 Summer Olympics
Olympic silver medallists for Great Britain
Olympic medalists in boxing
British male boxers
Medalists at the 1908 Summer Olympics
Deaths from the Spanish flu pandemic in England
19th-century British people
20th-century British people